Church of the Nativity of the Theotokos in Gaboš is Serbian Orthodox church in eastern Croatia. Restoration of church in Gaboš were funded by the Ministry of Religion of Serbia, Ministry of culture from Croatia and donations.

See also
Eparchy of Osječko polje and Baranja
Gaboš
Serbs of Croatia
List of Serbian Orthodox churches in Croatia

References

Gaboši